Mount Magnet Airport  is an airport at Mount Magnet, Western Australia. The airport received over $400,000 for security updates in 2006. The funds were allocated for a secure baggage area, fencing, lighting, and connecting the airport to the Mt Magnet power grid.

Airlines and destinations

See also
 List of airports in Western Australia
 Aviation transport in Australia

References

External links
 Airservices Aerodromes & Procedure Charts

Airports in Western Australia
Mid West (Western Australia)